Clover Hill, Virginia may refer to:
Clover Hill, the former name for Appomattox Court House
Clover Hill, Rockingham County, Virginia
Clover Hill, Albemarle County, Virginia
Clover Hill, Chesterfield County, Virginia
Clover Hill High School
Clover Hill Railroad